This article gives an overview of political liberalism and radicalism in Ecuador. It is limited to liberal and radical parties with substantial support, mainly proved by having had representation in parliament. The sign ⇒ means a reference to another party in that scheme. (For inclusion in this scheme it is not necessary that a party have labeled itself "liberal".)

Introduction
Liberalism has been one of the dominant political forces in Ecuador since the late 19th century. The movement became divided and lost influence in the second half of the 20th century. The Alfarista Radical Front (Frente Radical Alfarista) and the Ecuadorian Radical Liberal Party (Partido Liberal Radical Ecuatoriana) are two small remnants of the traditional liberal current in the country.

History

The timeline

From Liberal Party to Ecuadorian Radical Liberal Party
 1878: Eloy Alfaro founded the Liberal Party (Partido Liberal)
 1925: The party is renamed into Ecuadorian Radical Liberal Party (Partido Liberal Radical Ecuatoriano)
 1978: A faction formed the ⇒ Radical Democratic Party

Radical Alfarist Front
 1972: Radical liberals founded the Alfarista Radical Front (Frente Radical Alfarista)

Radical Democratic Party / Democratic Party
 1978: Dissidents from the ⇒ Ecuadorian Radical Liberal Party founded the Radical Democratic Party (Partido Radical Demócrata), renamed the same year in Democratic Party (Partido Demócrata)
1990s: The party disappeared

Liberal leaders
Eloy Alfaro
Luis Vargas Torres

Liberal actions
Liberal Revolution of 1895
Concha Revolution (1912-1916)

See also
 History of Ecuador
 Politics of Ecuador
 List of political parties in Ecuador

References

Political movements in Ecuador
Ecuador